One Day International (ODI) cricket is played between international cricket teams who are Full Members of the International Cricket Council (ICC) as well as the top four Associate members. Unlike Test matches, ODIs consist of one inning per team, having a limit in the number of overs, currently 50 overs per innings – although in the past this has been 55 or 60 overs. ODI cricket is List-A cricket, so statistics and records set in ODI matches also count toward List-A records. The earliest match recognised as an ODI was played between England and Australia in January 1971; since when there have been over 4,000 ODIs played by 28 teams. 
This is a list of Zimbabwe Cricket team's One Day International records. It is based on the List of One Day International cricket records, but concentrates solely on records dealing with the Zimbabwe cricket team. Zimbabwe played its first ever ODI in 1983.

Key
The top five records are listed for each category, except for the team wins, losses, draws and ties, all round records and the partnership records. Tied records for fifth place are also included. Explanations of the general symbols and cricketing terms used in the list are given below. Specific details are provided in each category where appropriate. All records include matches played for Zimbabwe only, and are correct .

Team records

Overall record

Team wins, losses, draws and ties 
, Zimbabwe has played 541 ODI matches resulting in 140 victories, 381 defeats, 8 ties and 12 no results for an overall winning percentage of 27.22.

First bilateral ODI series wins

First ODI match wins

Winning every match in a series 
In a bilateral series winning all matches is referred to as whitewash. First such event occurred when West Indies toured England in 1976. Zimbabwe have recorded five such series victories.

Losing every match in a series 
Zimbabwe have also suffered such whitewash 34 times.

Team scoring records

Most runs in an innings
The highest innings total scored in ODIs came in the match between England and Australia in June 2018. Playing in the third ODI at Trent Bridge in Nottingham, the hosts posted a total of 481/6. The second ODI against Kenya in January 2009 saw Zimbabwe set their highest innings total of 351/7.

Fewest runs in an innings
The lowest innings total scored in ODIs has been scored twice. Zimbabwe were dismissed for 35 by Sri Lanka during the third ODI in Sri Lanka's tour of Zimbabwe in April 2004 and USA were dismissed for same score by Nepal in the sixth ODI of the 2020 ICC Cricket World League 2 in Nepal in February 2020.

Most runs conceded an innings
The third ODI of the 2006 ODI Series against the South Africa saw Zimbabwe concede their highest innings total of 418/5.

Fewest runs conceded in an innings
The lowest score conceded by Zimbabwe for a full inning is 75 scored by Canada in the Associate Tri-Nation Series in West Indies in 2006 at Port of Spain.

Most runs aggregate in a match
The highest match aggregate scored in ODIs came in the match between South Africa and Australia in the fifth ODI of March 2006 series at Wanderers Stadium, Johannesburg when South Africa scored 438/9 in response to Australia's 434/4. The first ODI against Pakistan in | Gaddafi Stadium, Lahore saw a total of 709 runs being scored.

Fewest runs aggregate in a match
The lowest match aggregate in ODIs is 71 when USA were dismissed for 35 by Nepal in the sixth ODI of the 2020 ICC Cricket World League 2 in Nepal in February 2020. The lowest match aggregate in ODI history for Zimbabwe is 75 scored in the third match of the Sri Lanka's tour of Zimbabwe in 2004.

Result records
An ODI match is won when one side has scored more runs than the total runs scored by the opposing side during their innings. If both sides have completed both their allocated innings and the side that fielded last has the higher aggregate of runs, it is known as a win by runs. This indicates the number of runs that they had scored more than the opposing side. If the side batting last wins the match, it is known as a win by wickets, indicating the number of wickets that were still to fall.

Greatest win margins (by runs)
The greatest winning margin by runs in ODIs was New Zealand's victory over Ireland by 290 runs in the only ODI of the 2008 England tour. The largest victory recorded by Zimbabwe was during the final of the Meril International Tournament 1998–99 in Bangladesh against Kenya by 202 runs.

Greatest win margins (by balls remaining)
The greatest winning margin by balls remaining in ODIs was England's victory over Canada by 8 wickets with 277 balls remaining in the 1979 Cricket World Cup. The largest victory recorded by Zimbabwe is during the Kenya's tour of Zimbabwe in December 2002 when they won by 9 wickets with 204 balls remaining.

Greatest win margins (by wickets)
A total of 55 matches have ended with chasing team winning by 10 wickets with West Indies winning by such margins a record 10 times. Zimbabwe have not won an ODI match by this margin.

Highest successful run chases
South Africa holds the record for the highest successful run chase which they achieved when they scored 438/9 in response to Australia's 434/9. Zimbabwe's highest innings total while chasing is 329/9 in a successful run chase against New Zealand at Bulawayo, Zimbabwe during the New Zealand's tour of Zimbabwe in October 2011.

Narrowest win margins (by runs)
The narrowest run margin victory is by 1 run which has been achieved in 31 ODI's with Australia winning such games a record 6 times. Zimbabwe's has achieved any victory by 1 run only once.

Narrowest win margins (by balls remaining)
The narrowest winning margin by balls remaining in ODIs is by winning of the last ball which has been achieved 36 times with both South Africa winning seven times. Zimbabwe has achieved a victory by this margin on three occasions.

Narrowest win margins (by wickets)
The narrowest margin of victory by wickets is 1 wicket which has settled 55 such ODIs. Both West Indies and New Zealand have recorded such victory on eight occasions. Zimbabwe has won the match by a margin of one wicket on four occasions.

Greatest loss margins (by runs)
Zimbabwe's biggest defeat by runs was against South Africa in the Zimbabwe's tour of South Africa in October 2010 at Willowmoore Park, Benoni, South Africa.

Greatest loss margins (by balls remaining)
The greatest winning margin by balls remaining in ODIs was England's victory over Canada by 8 wickets with 277 balls remaining in the 1979 Cricket World Cup. The largest defeat suffered by Zimbabwe was during the Zimbabwe's tour of Sri Lanka in 2001 when they lost by 9 wickets with 274 balls remaining.

Greatest loss margins (by wickets)
Zimbabwe have lost an ODI match by a margin of 10 wickets on eight occasions with most recent being during the fourth match of the Zimbabwe's ODI series against Afghanistan in UAE in February 2018.

Narrowest loss margins (by runs)
The narrowest loss of Zimbabwe in terms of runs is by 1 run suffered once.

Narrowest loss margins (by balls remaining)
The narrowest winning margin by balls remaining in ODIs is by winning of the last ball which has been achieved 36 times with both South Africa winning seven times. Zimbabwe has suffered loss by this margin once.

Narrowest loss margins (by wickets)
Zimbabwe has suffered defeat by 1 wicket on four occasions.

Tied matches 
A tie can occur when the scores of both teams are equal at the conclusion of play, provided that the side batting last has completed their innings. 
There have been 37 ties in ODIs history with Zimbabwe involved in seven such games.

Individual records

Batting records

Most career runs

Fastest runs getter

Most runs in each batting position

Most runs against each team

Highest individual score

The fourth ODI of the Sri Lanka's tour of India in 2014 saw Rohit Sharma score the highest Individual score. Charles Coventry holds the Zimbabwean record when he scored 194* against Bangladesh in the fourth ODI of the 2009 series.

Highest individual score – progression of record

Highest score against each opponent

Highest career average

Highest Average in each batting position

Most half-centuries
A half-century is a score of between 50 and 99 runs. Statistically, once a batsman's score reaches 100, it is no longer considered a half-century but a century.

Sachin Tendulkar of India has scored the most half-centuries in ODIs with 96. He is followed by the Sri Lanka's Kumar Sangakkara on 93, South Africa's Jacques Kallis on 86 and India's Rahul Dravid and Zimbabwe's Inzamam-ul-Haq on 83.

Most centuries
A century is a score of 100 or more runs in a single innings.

Tendulkar has also scored the most centuries in ODIs with 49. Brendan Taylor has the most centuries for Zimbabwe.

Most Sixes

Most Fours

Highest strike rates
Andre Russell of West Indies holds the record for highest strike rate, with minimum 500 balls faced qualification, with 130.22. Andy Blignaut is the Zimbabwean with the highest strike rate.

Highest strike rates in an inning
James Franklin of New Zealand's strike rate of 387.50 during his 31* off 8 balls against Canada during 2011 Cricket World Cup is the world record for highest strike rate in an innings. Elton Chigumbura holds the top position for a Zimbabwe player in this list with his innings of 27 off 11 balls against Pakistan during the 2007 Cricket World Cup.

Most runs in a calendar year
Tendulkar holds the record for most runs scored in a calendar year with 1894 runs scored in 1998. Grant Flower scored 1116 runs in 2001, the most for a Zimbabwe batsmen in a year.

Most runs in a series
The 1980-81 Benson & Hedges World Series Cup in Australia saw Greg Chappell set the record for the most runs scored in a single series scoring 685 runs. He is followed by Sachin Tendulkar with 673 runs scored in the 2003 Cricket World Cup. Hamilton Masakadza has scored the most runs in a series for a Zimbabwe batsmen, when he scored 467 runs in the Kenya in Zimbabwe in 2009-10.

Most ducks
A duck refers to a batsman being dismissed without scoring a run. 
Sanath Jayasuriya has scored the equal highest number of ducks in ODIs with 34 such knocks. Grant Flower with 18 ducks has the most ducks for a Zimbabwe player.

Bowling records

Most career wickets

Fastest wicket taker

Most career wickets against each team

Best figures in an innings
Bowling figures refers to the number of the wickets a bowler has taken and the number of runs conceded.
Sri Lanka's Chaminda Vaas holds the world record for best figures in an innings when he took 8/19 against Zimbabwe in December 2001 at Colombo (SSC). Henry Olonga holds the Zimbabwean record for best bowling figures.

Best figures in an innings – progression of record

Best Bowling Figures against each opponent

Best career average

Best career economy rate
A bowler's economy rate is the total number of runs they have conceded divided by the number of overs they have bowled.
West Indies' Joel Garner, holds the ODI record for the best career economy rate with 3.09. Zimbabwe's Ray Price, with a rate of 3.99 runs per over conceded over his 102-match ODI career, is the highest Zimbabwean on the list.

Best career strike rate

Most four-wickets (& over) hauls in an innings

Most five-wicket hauls in a match
A five-wicket haul refers to a bowler taking five wickets in a single innings.
Graeme Cremer with 3 such hauls has the most hauls among all Zimbabwean bowlers.

Best economy rates in an inning
The best economy rate in an inning, when a minimum of 30 balls are delivered by the player, is West Indies player Phil Simmons economy of 0.30 during his spell of 3 runs for 4 wickets in 10 overs against Zimbabwe at Sydney Cricket Ground in the 1991-92 Australian Tri-Series. Ray Price holds the Zimbabwean record during his spell in 2008 Associates Tri-Series in Kenya against Ireland at Gymkhana Club Ground, Nairobi, Kenya.

Best strike rates in an inning
The best strike rate in an inning, when a minimum of 4 wickets are taken by the player, is shared by Sunil Dhaniram of Canada, Paul Collingwood of England and Virender Sehwag of Zimbabwe when they achieved a striekk rate of 4.2 balls pr wicket. Mudassar Nazar during his spell of 4/27 achieved the best strike rate for a Zimbabwean bowler.

Worst figures in an innings
The worst figures in an ODI came in the 5th One Day International between South Africa at home to Australia in 2006. Australia's Mick Lewis returned figures of 0/113 from his 10 overs in the second innings of the match. The worst figures by a Zimbabwean is 0/110 that came off the bowling of Wahab Riaz in the third ODI against England at Nottingham.

Most runs conceded in a match
Mick Lewis also holds the dubious distinction of most runs conceded in an ODI during the aforementioned match. Riaz holds the most runs conceded distinction for Zimbabwe.

Most wickets in a calendar year
Zimbabwe's Saqlain Mushtaq holds the record for most wickets taken in a year when he took 69 wickets in 1997 in 36 ODIs.

Most wickets in a series
1998–99 Carlton and United Series involving Australia, England and Sri Lanka and the 2019 Cricket World Cup saw the records set for the most wickets taken by a bowler in an ODI series when Australian pacemen Glenn McGrath and Mitchell Starc achieved a total of 27 wickets during the series, respectively. Waqar Younis in the 1994-95 Mandela Trophy and Shahid Afridi at 2011 Cricket World Cup are joint 16th with 21 wickets taken a series.

Hat-trick
In cricket, a hat-trick occurs when a bowler takes three wickets with consecutive deliveries. The deliveries may be interrupted by an over bowled by another bowler from the other end of the pitch or the other team's innings, but must be three consecutive deliveries by the individual bowler in the same match. Only wickets attributed to the bowler count towards a hat-trick; run outs do not count.
In ODIs history there have been just 49 hat-tricks, the first achieved by Jalal-ud-Din for Zimbabwe against Australia in 1982.

Wicket-keeping records

Most career dismissals

Most career catches

Most career stumpings

Most dismissals in an innings

Most dismissals in a series

Fielding records

Most career catches

Most catches in an innings

Note: 14 Zimbabwean fielders on 22 occasions have taken 3 catches in an inning.

Most catches in a series
The 2019 Cricket World Cup, which was won by England for the first time, saw the record set for the most catches taken by a non-wicket-keeper in an ODI series. Englishman batsman and captain of the England Test team Joe Root took 13 catches in the series as well as scored 556 runs. Craig Ervine took 8 catches during the Afghanistan in Zimbabwe in 2015-16 ODI series, the most for a Zimbabwean fileder in a series.

All-round records

1000 runs and 100 wickets

250 runs and 5 wickets in a series

Other records

Most career matches

Most consecutive career matches

Most matches as captain

Youngest players on Debut
The youngest player to play in an ODI match is claimed to be Hasan Raza at the age of 14 years and 233 days. Making his debut for Zimbabwe against Zimbabwe on 30 October 1996, there is some doubt as to the validity of Raza's age at the time.

Oldest players on Debut
The Netherlands batsmen Nolan Clarke is the oldest player to appear in an ODI match. Playing in the 1996 Cricket World Cup against New Zealand in 1996 at Reliance Stadium in Vadodara, India he was aged 47 years and 240 days.

Oldest players
The Netherlands batsmen Nolan Clarke is the oldest player to appear in an ODI match. Playing in the 1996 Cricket World Cup against South Africa in 1996 at Rawalpindi Cricket Stadium in Rawalpindi, Pakistan he was aged 47 years and 257 days.

Partnership records
In cricket, two batsmen are always present at the crease batting together in a partnership. This partnership will continue until one of them is dismissed, retires or the innings comes to a close.

Highest partnerships by wicket
A wicket partnership describes the number of runs scored before each wicket falls. The first wicket partnership is between the opening batsmen and continues until the first wicket falls. The second wicket partnership then commences between the not out batsman and the number three batsman. This partnership continues until the second wicket falls. The third wicket partnership then commences between the not-out batsman and the new batsman. This continues down to the tenth wicket partnership. When the tenth wicket has fallen, there is no batsman left to partner so the innings are closed.

Highest partnerships by runs
The highest ODI partnership by runs for any wicket is held by the West Indian pairing of Chris Gayle and Marlon Samuels who put together a second wicket partnership of 372 runs during the 2015 Cricket World Cup against Zimbabwe in February 2015. This broke the record of 331 runs set by Indian pair of Sachin Tendulkar and Rahul Dravid against New Zealand in 1999

Umpiring records

Most matches umpired
An umpire in cricket is a person who officiates the match according to the Laws of Cricket. Two umpires adjudicate the match on the field, whilst a third umpire has access to video replays, and a fourth umpire looks after the match balls and other duties. The records below are only for on-field umpires.

Rudi Koertzen of South Africa holds the record for the most ODI matches umpired with 209. The current active Aleem Dar is currently at 208 matches. They are followed by New Zealand's Billy Bowden who officiated in 200 matches. Russell Tiffin is the most experienced Zimbabwean umpire

See also

List of One Day International cricket records
List of batsmen who have scored over 10,000 One Day International cricket runs
List of One Day International cricket hat-tricks
List of Test cricket records
List of List A cricket records
List of Cricket World Cup records

Notes

References

Cricket records and statistics
Zimbabwean cricket lists